This is a list of people on stamps of Ireland, including the years when they appeared on a stamp.

Because no Irish stamps were designed prior to 1929, the first Irish stamps issued by the Provisional Government of Ireland were the then-current British definitive postage stamps bearing a portrait of George V that were overprinted Rialtas Sealadaċ na hÉireann 1922 (translates as Provisional Government of Ireland 1922) and issued on 17 February 1922. The overprint was later changed to Saorstát Éireann 1922 (Irish Free State 1922).

The Irish Free State issued the first commemorative stamps depicting a person on 22 June 1929 when Oifig an Phoist, the Irish Post Office, a section of  the Department of Posts and Telegraphs, issued a set of three stamps showing Daniel O'Connell. O'Connell is one of a small number of people shown in two issues, including Wolfe Tone and Arthur Guinness. The 2009 Guinness issue included postmarks with his trade mark signature, a first in philately.

The Department of Posts and Telegraphs and, after 1984, An Post, designed stamps showing statesmen, religious, literary and cultural figures, athletes, etc. Until the mid-1990s it was usual policy not to issue stamps showing living persons, the only exceptions being Douglas Hyde (stamp 1943, d. 1949, illustrated below) and Louis le Brocquy (stamp 1977, d. 2012, illustrated below), but this policy has been put aside and there have recently been several issues showing living persons. For the millennium, 30 millennium stamps were issued showing living Irish sportsmen.

During the release of the 2022 Irish Oscar Winners stamps, An Post's retain managing director stated that The Irish Oscar Winners stamps celebrate the best in the business and serve as a reminder of what we, as Irish people, can achieve.

1929–1950s

1960s and 1970s

1980s 
1980

1981

1982

1983

1984

1985

1986

1987

1988

1989

1990s 
1990
 Michael Collins

1991

1993
 Edward Bunting

1994

1995

1996

1996 Centenary of Irish Cinema, 4-stamp set featuring 12 Irish actors in 4 Irish films

1997 75th Anniversary of Irish Free State

1997

1998

1999

2000–2004 

2000

2001

2002

2003

2004

2005–2010
2005

2006

2007

2008

2009

2010

2011–2015
2011

2012

2013

2014

2015

2016–2020

2016 Easter Rising centenary definitives

2016
 St Patrick
 Charles Gavan Duffy

2017

2018

2019

2020

2021–25
2021

2022

See also
Irish topics
Postage stamps of Ireland

References and sources
Notes

Sources
 
 
 
 
 

Ireland, List of people on stamps of
Stamps
Postage stamps of the Republic of Ireland
Stamps